Longtan District is a rural district in southern Taoyuan City, Taiwan. Longtan is home to the headquarters of the Republic of China Army.

The township is known for the Buddhist temple in the center of Longtan Lake and the large Bainien community project. The area is surrounded by high-tech industries and mountains.

Longtan is home to a number of military bases, and a few research installations. National Chung-Shan Institute of Science and Technology and Institute of Nuclear Energy Research are two of the more well known ones.

History
Longtan used to be a rural township of the former Taoyuan County. On 25 December 2014, it was upgraded into a district of Taoyuan City.

Geography
 Area: 75.23 km2
 Population: 125,324 people (February 2023)

Administrative divisions
Huangtang, Yongxing, Zhongshan, Wushulin, Wulin, Bonian, Lingyun, Longxiang, Bade, Shengde, Shanglin, Longtan, Longxing, Zhongzheng, Shanghua, Jiulong, Wuhan, Tungxing, Zhongxing, Beixing, Jiaan, Sankeng, Daping, Sanlin, Jianlin, Fulin, Gaoping, Gaoyuan, Sanhe and Sanshui Village.

Politics
The district is part of Taoyuan City Constituency V electoral district for Legislative Yuan.

Government institutes
 Institute of Nuclear Energy Research
 National Chung-Shan Institute of Science and Technology

Education
 Hsin Sheng College of Medical Care and Management

Tourist attractions
 Longtan Lake
 Longtan National Speedway
 Shihmen Dam
 Taoyuan Hakka Culture Hall
 Window on China Theme Park
 Yehshan Building

Transportation

Bus stations

 Longtan Bus Station of Hsinchu Bus
 Longtan Bus Station of Taoyuan Bus

Highway
Longtan is served by National Highway No. 3.

Notable natives

 Esther Huang, actress and singer
 You Rizheng, politician
 Teng Yu-hsien, former musician

See also
 Taoyuan City

References

External links

 
Facebook fanpage (I Love Longtan)

Districts of Taoyuan City